Yurivka is a common name for a Ukrainian locality:

Raions
Yurivka Raion, a former raion in Dniproperrovsk Oblast

Urban-type settlements
 Yurivka, Dnipropetrovsk Oblast, an urban-type settlement and raion center of Dnipropetrovsk Oblast
 Yurivka, Luhansk Oblast, an urban-type settlement in Luhansk Oblast